Jerry Mack  is an American football coach and former player.  He is the Running Backs coach at the University of Tennessee Volunteers.  He previously was the  offensive coordinator and Associate Head Coach of Rice Owls football team from December 2017 until February 2021. He was previously the head coach of the North Carolina Central Eagles football team.

Coaching career

Delta State
Mack began his coaching career as an offensive graduate assistant for Delta State between 2004 until 2005. During that period, he worked with the running backs, as an assistant special teams coordinator ,and video coordinator.

Jackson State
In 2006 and 2007 Mack served as the wide receivers coach and tight ends coach for Jackson State.

Central Arkansas
In 2008 and 2009 Mack worked at Central Arkansas as the team’s passing game coordinator and wide receivers coach.

Arkansas–Pine Bluff
For the 2010 season he worked for Arkansas-Pine Bluff as the team’s offensive coordinator and quarterbacks coach. He helped change an offense that was ranked 101st in the nation in total offense to 30th nationally.

Memphis
For the 2011 he went to work in his hometown of Memphis for the Tigers as the team’s wide receivers coach.

South Alabama
In 2012 and 2013 he served as the wide receivers coach for South Alabama Jaguars.

North Carolina Central
From 2014 to 2017 Mack served as the head coach for the North Carolina Central Eagles. Within his four seasons at North Carolina Central University as the team’s head coach, he led the Eagles to a berth in the 2016 Celebration Bowl. He compiled 31-15 record in four seasons as one of the youngest head coaches at the FBS/FCS level at the time. He was named the 2016 HBCU Football Coach of the Year by Black College Sports Page and The Pigskin Club in Washington, D.C., following NCCU breaking its school record for offense on its way to the Celebration Bowl.

Rice
Mack was named Rice's offensive coordinator  and quarterbacks coach on Dec. 12, 2017. On Feb. 13, 2019 he was given the extra title as associate head coach. He stayed there until the end of the 2020 season.

Tennessee
In 2021 Mack became the running backs coach for the Tennessee Volunteers.

Head coaching record

Personal life
Jerry and his wife Starlett have three children.

References

External links
 Rice profile

1980 births
Living people
American football wide receivers
Arkansas State Red Wolves football players
Arkansas–Pine Bluff Golden Lions football coaches
Central Arkansas Bears football coaches
Delta State Statesmen football coaches
Jackson State Tigers football coaches
Jackson State Tigers football players
Memphis Tigers football coaches
North Carolina Central Eagles football coaches
Rice Owls football coaches
South Alabama Jaguars football coaches
Players of American football from Memphis, Tennessee
Sportspeople from Memphis, Tennessee
Tennessee Volunteers football coaches
African-American coaches of American football
African-American players of American football
21st-century African-American sportspeople
20th-century African-American people